The 2022 Turkish Basketball Presidential Cup was the 36th edition of the Turkish Basketball Presidential Cup. The game was played between Anadolu Efes, winners of the 2022 Turkish Basketball Cup and Fenerbahçe Beko, champions of the 2021–22 Basketbol Süper Ligi.

Anadolu Efes won their 13th championship in their 24th final appearance, while Fenerbahçe played a total of 17 President's Cup finals and won only 7 of them.

Venue

Match details 
Ante Žižić, who had 22 points, 9 rebounds and 1 assist in the game, was named the Presidential Cup MVP.

References

External links
Official Website 
Turkish Basketball Federation (TBF) Official website 

Presidents Cup
2022
Turkish Cup 2022